Merry, Merry Christmas is the third studio and only Christmas album by pop act New Kids on the Block, released in the United States by Columbia Records on September 19, 1989 (see 1989 in music). It features seasonal songs, both cover versions and original material. Released at a time when the band was peaking, it went double platinum and spawned the top ten single, "This One's for the Children". On October 14, 2008 it was released to iTunes.

The deathcore band I Declare War used the same album cover image for a Christmas themed EP they released titled Bring the Season  (2007).

Track listing

Charts

Weekly charts

Year-end charts

Certifications and sales

References 

New Kids on the Block albums
1989 Christmas albums
1989 albums
Albums produced by Maurice Starr
Christmas albums by American artists
Pop Christmas albums